Elachista levipes is a moth of the family Elachistidae. It is found in Australia, where it has been recorded from New South Wales. It is possibly also present in Tasmania.

The wingspan is 5.8-6.2 mm. The ground colour of the forewings is grey with dark grey-tipped scales. The hindwings are dark grey.

References

Moths described in 2011
levipes
Moths of Australia